Superstar Racing Experience (SRX), officially known as the Camping World SRX Series, is an American stock car racing series founded by Tony Stewart, Ray Evernham, Sandy Montag and George Pyne. The formation of the series was announced on July 13, 2020, and debuted on June 12, 2021, televised on CBS.

On January 31, 2022, the series was renewed for a second season that premiered on June 18, 2022. It's 3rd season is set to air on July 13th, 2023 on ESPN.

History
On July 13, 2020, it was reported that SRX was in preparation for a 2021 debut season. The series' founders included former NASCAR driver and current team owner Tony Stewart, former NASCAR team owner and crew chief Ray Evernham as well as former NASCAR executive George Pyne and sports agent Sandy Montag. Initially, series management was split between New York City and Charlotte, North Carolina.

Camping World acquired the naming rights to the series on June 1, 2021, dubbing it the Camping World SRX Series.

On January 20, 2022, Don Hawk was named CEO of SRX. On March 30, Evernham announced via Twitter that he was no longer in charge of SRX, but has kept his role as an investor of the sport.

Championship
SRX draws direct contrast from NASCAR when aiming for shorter races at shorter tracks, and also with the random pairing of driver and crew chief for each race. Founder Tony Stewart compared it to IROC by comparing the aspects of identical cars and an all-star cast of drivers.

Cars
SRX cars were completely designed by founder Ray Evernham and were in concept stage when the series was founded in July 2020. Teaser photos of the car showed it has a high rear spoiler and is said to have high horsepower and low downforce. Fury Race Cars serves as the cars' chassis designer and builder. The cars use naturally aspirated Ilmor V8 396 cui engines, which are primarily featured in the ARCA Menards Series, with components from Edelbrock, while brakes are provided by Performance Friction Corporation (PFC).

Drivers receive their cars before each race via random draw. A driver's car retains its color for the full season for easy identification.

Drivers
The series' lineup is made up of younger up and coming drivers looking for exposure in addition to the older and retired drivers. In addition to those running the full schedule, the series provides a "Rocky Balboa" car for a local champion at each track and a "ringer" entry for notable drivers making cameo appearances.

The drivers for the inaugural SRX season included Tony Stewart, Bobby Labonte, Hélio Castroneves, Ernie Francis Jr., Paul Tracy, Bill Elliott, Willy T. Ribbs, Michael Waltrip, and Marco Andretti for all six races. 
Part-time drivers and Local Legend drivers include: Tony Kanaan, Hailie Deegan,  Greg Biffle, Scott Speed, Doug Coby, Brian Brown, Scott Bloomquist, Kody Swanson, Luke Fenhaus and Chase Elliott.

Tracks
Races are primarily held on half-mile dirt and asphalt short tracks. The six tracks from the series' first season was Stafford Motor Speedway, Knoxville Raceway, Eldora Speedway, Lucas Oil Raceway, Slinger Speedway, and Nashville Fairgrounds Speedway. The 2022 schedule featured Five Flags Speedway, South Boston Speedway, Stafford Motor Speedway, Nashville Fairgrounds Speedway, I-55 Raceway and Sharon Speedway. The 2023 schedule will feature Stafford and Eldora, but will also feature new tracks Thunder Road SpeedBowl, Motor Mile Speedway, Berlin Raceway and Lucas Oil Speedway.

Race format
Races last 90 minutes without pit stops, though there is also a "halftime" for adjustments to be made to the car.

Two 12-minute heat races take place before the feature; the final lap begins when time runs out and the leader crosses the start/finish line. A random draw sets the starting lineup for the first heat, while the second is determined by an inversion of the first race's finishing results. The duration of the heats was originally set to 15 minutes before being changed following the inaugural race.

The feature race is 100 laps long at all paved ovals but Slinger, where the distance is 150 laps, while the dirt tracks have 50-lap features. The starting order is based on average finishing position between the two heats. There are also unlimited attempts at a green–white–checker finish.

Statistics

Series champions

Drivers

Media
CBS Sports aired the 2021 six-race season in two-hour primetime Saturday night television windows on the main CBS network.

On April 14, 2021, CBS announced their broadcast team for the inaugural season. Veteran motorsports announcer Allen Bestwick served as lead announcer, with Lindsay Czarniak as host, Brad Daugherty as roaming reporter, and Matt Yocum on pit road. Three driver analysts, Danica Patrick (Stafford and Knoxville), James Hinchcliffe (Eldora, Slinger and Nashville Fairgrounds), and Dario Franchitti (Lucas Oil) were the color analysts for the inaugural season.

Bestwick, Yocum, Daugherty, and Czarniak returned for the 2022 season, while 2021 driver Willy T. Ribbs joined the broadcast team as an analyst. Conor Daly was signed as a driver analyst.

A video game based on the series, titled SRX: The Game and developed by Monster Games, was released for PlayStation 4, Xbox One, and Steam on May 28, 2021.

The 2023 season, made up of six races like in previous years, will air on ESPN on Thursday nights from July 13th to August 17th.

See also
 International Race of Champions
 Fast Masters
 Grand Prix Masters

References

External links
 Official website

2020 establishments in the United States
Auto racing organizations in the United States
Stock car racing series in the United States
Professional sports leagues in the United States
Tony Stewart
CBS Sports
One-make series